The  Hundreds of Cheshire, as with other Hundreds in England, were the geographic divisions of Cheshire for administrative, military and judicial purposes. They were introduced in Cheshire some time before the Norman conquest. Later on, both the number and names of the hundreds changed by processes of land being lost from Cheshire, and merging or amalgamation of remaining hundreds. The Ancient parishes of Cheshire were usually wholly within a specific hundred, although a few were divided between two hundreds.

The hundreds at the time of the Domesday Survey

Cheshire, in the Domesday Book was recorded as a larger county than it is today. There is a small disagreement in published sources about where the northern boundary of Cheshire lay, and some parts of the border areas with Wales were disputed with the predecessors of Wales. One source states that the northern border was the River Ribble, resulting in large parts of what was to become Lancashire being at that time part of Cheshire. This area is included as "Inter Ripam et Mersam" in the Domesday Book. However, more recent sources confirm that the actual boundary at that time was the River Mersey. The ancient parish of Whitchurch in Hodnet Hundred appears in both Cheshire and Shropshire rolls of the Domesday Survey.

Twelve hundreds
The land south of the River Mersey was made up of twelve hundreds: Atiscross, Bochelau, Chester, Dudestan, Exestan, Hamestan, Middlewich, Riseton, Roelau, Tunendune, Warmundestrou and Wilaveston, with the hundreds of Atiscross and Exestan being disputed with the Kingdom of Gwynedd. (There are slight variations between various sources in the spellings of these names.) The hundreds in between the Mersey and the Ribble (Inter Ripam et Mersam) were: West Derby ("Derbei"), Newton ("Neweton"), Warrington ("Walingtune"), Salford, Blackburn ("Blacheburn") and Leyland ("Lailand").

This uncertain nature of the northern border lasted until 1182, when the land north of the Mersey became administered as part of the new county of Lancashire.  Later, the hundreds of Atiscross and Exestan became firmly part of Wales, as did part of the Dudestan hundred.

Emergence of the later hundreds

Over the years the remaining ten hundreds consolidated to just seven with changed names: Broxton, Bucklow, Eddisbury, Macclesfield, Nantwich, Northwich and Wirral. The date at which this process happened is not clear: These newer names are reported to be all in use by 1259 to 1260. The same source reports research that has found Macclesfield Hundred to be named in 1242 and Eddisbury Hundred by the late 12th century. Chester lost its hundred status, but was subsequently given the status of "county of itself" and was known as the City and County of Chester.

Broxton
This hundred was mainly formed from the old Dudestan hundred. The southern part of Dudestan was transferred to Wales where it was known as Maelor Saesneg, and (later still) "Flintshire Detached" (see Ancient county of Flintshire.)
Broxton hundred from time to time contained all or part of the following parishes:
Aldford
Backford
Bunbury (until 1866 – to Eddisbury hundred)
Chester St. Mary on the Hill
Chester St. Oswald
Christleton
Coddington
Dodleston
Eccleston
Farndon
Guilden Sutton
Handley
Harthill
Malpas
Plemstall
Pulford
Shocklach
Tarvin
Tattenhall
Tilston
Waverton

Bucklow

Bucklow was known to have been in existence at least as early as 1260. It was formed from the earlier Domesday hundreds of Bochelau and Tunendune.

Eddisbury
Eddisbury included the ancient parishes of:
Barrow
Bunbury (from Broxton hundred after 1866)
Chester St. Oswald
Delamere
Frodsham
Great Budworth
Ince
Little Budworth
Middlewich
Over
Plemstall
Tarporley
Tarvin
Thornton le Moors
Weaverham cum Milton
Whitegate

Macclesfield

Macclesfield was known to have been in existence at least as early as 1242. It was formed to a great extent from the earlier Domesday hundred of Hamestan.

Wirral

Wirral was formed from the earlier Domesday hundred of Wilaveston.

References

Notes

Bibliography

 
Cheshire